The Ambassador Extraordinary and Plenipotentiary of the Russian Federation to the Czech Republic is the official representative of the President and the Government of the Russian Federation to the President and the Government of the Czech Republic.

The ambassador and his staff work at large in the Embassy of Russia in Prague. There are consulates general in Brno and Karlovy Vary, and an honorary consul based in Ostrava.

History of diplomatic relations

Diplomatic exchanges between the Soviet Union and Czechoslovakia began with the formal establishment of relations on 5 June 1922.  Relations were maintained throughout the twentieth century, with a brief break after the German occupation of Czechoslovakia in 1939, until the reestablishment of relations in 1941. With the repudiation of communism, the country officially became the Czech and Slovak Federative Republic in 1990. With the dissolution of the Soviet Union in 1991, a new ambassador, was appointed as representative of the Russian Federation. He continued as ambassador until the dissolution of Czechoslovakia and its separation into the states of the Czech Republic and Slovakia. Lebedev continued to as representative to the Czech Republic until 1996, while a new ambassador, Sergey Yastrzhembsky, was appointed Russian ambassador to Slovakia in June 1993.

Representatives of the Russian Federation to the Czech Republic (1993 – present)

References 

 
Czech Republic
Russia